Robert Earle Drope (14 October 1898 – 7 October 1969) was a Progressive Conservative party member of the House of Commons of Canada. He was born in Harwood, Ontario and became a farmer and manager by career.

Drope served in the military during World War I, attaining the rank of major. Later, he was a municipal councillor for Hamilton Township for five years. He also managed the Harwood Cooperative Creamery.

He was first elected to Parliament at the Northumberland riding in the 1945 general election, serving one term in office until his defeat in 1949 by Frederick Robertson of the Liberal party.

References

External links
 

1898 births
1969 deaths
Canadian farmers
Canadian military personnel of World War I
Members of the House of Commons of Canada from Ontario
Ontario municipal councillors
People from Northumberland County, Ontario
Progressive Conservative Party of Canada MPs